The Velvets were an American doo-wop group from Odessa, Texas, United States. They were formed in 1959 by Virgil Johnson, a high-school English teacher, with four of his students. Roy Orbison heard the group and signed them to Monument Records in 1960.  Their first release was a tune called "That Lucky Old Sun". Their biggest hit single was "Tonight (Could Be the Night)", which hit #26 on the U.S. Billboard Hot 100 chart in 1961. The follow-up, "Laugh", peaked at #90, and after a half-dozen further singles the group disbanded.

Virgil Johnson, a former deejay at Radio KDAV in Lubbock, Texas, was the lead tenor singer, with backup from Mark Prince (bass), Clarence Rigsby (tenor), Robert Thursby (first tenor), and William Solomon (baritone). The four were originally Johnson's eighth-grade pupils in an English class which he instructed in Odessa, also in West Texas, in the 1959-1960 school year. 

"That Lucky Old Sun" (#46) and "Tonight (Could Be the Night)" (#50) made brief appearances in the UK Singles Chart in 1961.  

Their complete recorded output runs to thirty songs, which were collected on one compact disc and released on Ace Records in 1996.

Aftermath
Johnson was later a school principal before his death in February 2013. Clarence Rigsby was killed in an automobile accident in 1978.

Members
Virgil Johnson (1935–2013)
William Solomon (1941–2006)
Mark Prince
Clarence Rigsby (1947–1978)
Bob Thursby

References

Musical groups from Texas
Doo-wop groups
Musical groups established in 1959
Musical groups disestablished in 1962
African-American musical groups
American rock singers
Fury Records artists
Ace Records (United States) artists
Monument Records artists
1959 establishments in Texas